Bahiria is a genus of snout moths. It was erected by Boris Balinsky in 1994.

Species
Bahiria defecta Balinsky, 1994
Bahiria durbanica Balinsky, 1994
Bahiria flavicosta Balinsky, 1994
Bahiria latevalvata Balinsky, 1994
Bahiria macrognatha Balinsky, 1994
Bahiria magma Balinsky, 1994
Bahiria maytenella Yamanaka, 2004
Bahiria similis Balinsky, 1994
Bahiria ximanianata Balinsky, 1994

References

Balinsky, B.I., 1994. A study of African Phycitinae in the Transvaal Museum. 1-208.

Phycitini
Pyralidae genera